Pinback is an American indie rock band from San Diego, California. The band was formed in 1998 by singers, songwriters and multi-instrumentalists Armistead Burwell Smith IV and Rob Crow, who have been its two consistent members. They have released five studio albums and several other releases.

History and origin
The band's moniker is a reference to a character in the 1974 film Dark Star (played by Dan O'Bannon, who also co-wrote the film), directed by John Carpenter. Audio samples from this film are used frequently in the band's early works.

In 2004, Pinback signed to Touch and Go Records. They released their third album, Summer in Abaddon, later that year. In 2006, the band released a collection of rarities, entitled Nautical Antiques. Pinback's fourth full-length album, Autumn of the Seraphs, was released on September 11, 2007. They appeared live in a nationally broadcast interview and played a couple of songs on NPR's Talk of the Nation on October 8, 2007.

On April 1, 2009, it was announced that Pinback was working on a new album that would be released by Temporary Residence Ltd. Their fifth studio album, Information Retrieved, was released October 16, 2012. On August 15, 2012, Pinback released the song "Proceed to Memory" from Information Retrieved free to play through RollingStone.com.

Smith and Crow have been the band's two consistent members. They are typically joined by drummer Chris Prescott; Tom Zinser and Mario Rubalcaba have previously contributed drums. Other past members of the Pinback live band are: Erik Hoversten, Braden Diotte, Terrin Durfey, Ryan Bromley, Cameron Jones, Kenseth Thibideau, Brent Asbury, Gabriel Voiles, Dmitri Dziensuwski, Donny Van Zandt, and Thatcher Orbitashi.

Discography

Studio albums
 Pinback (1999)
 Blue Screen Life (2001)
 Summer in Abaddon (2004) U.S. No. 196
 Autumn of the Seraphs (2007) U.S. No. 69
 Information Retrieved (2012) U.S. No. 71

Compilations
 Nautical Antiques (2006)
 Some Offcell Voices (2017)

Extended plays
 Live in Donny's Garage (2000)
 Some Voices (2000)
 This Is a Pinback Tour E.P. (2001)
 More or Less Live in a Few Different Places  (2002)
 Arrive Having Eaten (2003)
 Offcell (2003)
 Too Many Shadows (2004)
 ascii E.P. (2008)
 Information Retrieved, Pt. A (2011)
 Information Retrieved Pt. B (2011)

Singles
"Loro" (1999)
"Tripoli" (2000)
"Penelope" (2001)
"Fortress" (2004)
"Todo" (2004)
"From Nothing to Nowhere" (2007)
"Proceed to Memory" (2012)
"Sherman" (2012)
"ROJI (Roshomon Effect)" (2018)

Guest appearances
 Elizabethtown (soundtrack) (2005)
 Sydney White (2007)
 How I Met Your Mother (2009)
 Yo Gabba Gabba! (2010)
 The O.C. (2003)

Members
Current
 Rob Crow – vocals, guitar (1998–present)
 Armistead Burwell Smith IV vocals, bass (1998–present)
 Chris Prescott – drums (2005–present)

Former
Tom Zinser - drums (1998-2003)
Thatcher Orbitachi - keyboards (1999)
Donny Van Zandt - keyboards (1999)
Dmitri Dziensuwski - keyboards (1999)
Gabriel Voiles - keyboards (1999)
Brent Asbury - keyboards (2000-2002)
Ryan Bromley - guitar, bass, keyboards (2001-2005)
Kenseth Thibideau - keyboards, bass, guitar (2003-2006)
Cameron Jones - drums (2004-2005)
Erik Hoversten - guitar, bass, keyboards (2006-2011)
Terrin Durfey - keyboards, bass, guitar (2007-2008)
Chris Fulford-Brown - keyboards, bass, guitar (2008)
Braden Diotte - keyboards, bass, guitar (2008-2011)

Live band timeline

References

External links

 Official website

Indie rock musical groups from California
Musical groups from San Diego
Musical groups established in 1998
Touch and Go Records artists
Temporary Residence Limited artists